Marcelle de Manziarly (13 October 1899, in Kharkov, Russian Empire (present-day Kharkiv, Ukraine) – 12 May 1989, in Ojai, California) was a French pianist, music educator, conductor and composer. She was born in Kharkiv, studied in Paris with Nadia Boulanger and at the age of 23 had already composed two mature works. She later studied conducting with Felix Weingartner in Basle and piano with Isabelle Vengerova in New York City and taught and performed in Europe and the United States. Aaron Copland dedicated his song "Heart, We Will Forget Him" to her. She died in Ojai, California, five months before her 90th birthday.

Works
Selected works include:
Trois Fables de Lafontaine (1935)
Six Etudes (pour Piano)
Trois Images Slaves
Impressions de Mer
Sonate pour Notre-Dame de Paris for orchestra
Sonata for two pianos
Musique pour orchestre
Trilogue
Incidences
La cigale et la fourmi (in Trois Fables de La Fontaine) (Text: Jean de La Fontaine) (1935)
La grenouille qui veut se faire aussi grosse que le boeuf (in Trois Fables de La Fontaine) (Text: Jean de La Fontaine) (1935)
L'oiseau blessé d'une flèche (in Trois Fables de La Fontaine) (Text: Jean de La Fontaine) (1935)
Le Cygne et le cuisinier (Text: Jean de La Fontaine) for mixed vocal quartet and piano (1959)
''Trois Sonnets de Pétrarque pour baryton et piano" (Texts : Petrarca) (1958 to 1960)

References

External links
Marsyas Trio performing Marcelle de Manziarly Flute Trio from YouTube

1899 births
1989 deaths
Musicians from Kharkiv
People from Kharkov Governorate
20th-century classical composers
French music educators
French classical composers
French women classical composers
20th-century French conductors (music)
20th-century French male musicians
20th-century French women musicians
20th-century French composers
Women music educators
20th-century women composers
Emigrants from the Russian Empire to France